Chernigov Province may refer to:
Chernigov Governorate, a governorate of the Russian Empire
Chernihiv Oblast, an administrative division of Ukraine